The Leasehold Reform Act 1967 (c 88) is an Act of Parliament of the United Kingdom, which concerns English land law and compulsory purchase.  A government bill, the law remains largely intact. It was passed by both Houses and had been tabled by ministers of the Labour government, 1964–1970.

Provisions and subsequent amendments
The Act grants the right to long leaseholders of houses let at low and moderately low rents to buy their homes compulsorily from their landlords at a fair price.

Initially the 1967 Act applied only to homes below these rateable values: £400  in London and £200 p.a. elsewhere (thus targeting low-to-middle income homeowners); the reform coincided with lower wages becoming less of a bar to access to loans from major mortgage lenders.

The Act has been amended many times to expand these rights, to homeowners having higher rateable values.

Background
English law and lending eschews the concept of flying freehold entire properties, such as flats. The solution was to set up a standard model of any flat ownership based on landlord and tenant but which is not seen in much of Europe where a more commonhold system of ownership is common, as long-term flat owners wish to gain a greater than 'transient' or 'time-barred' interest in their home.  Such long leases were already in use in housing, as before purpose-built apartments were built, an aristocratic or other large capitalist landlord could co-steer the successful, competitive development of their urban estates; these took the initial form of "building leases" then leases to allow the flexibility of the landlord deciding whether to create apartments, extensions, shorter-term lettings all of which liberties have been tempered by law or by secured lending codes to enhance the status of long-term lessees. The dozen or so private great collections of reversions continue the landlord-tenant relation with piecemeal reductions, across the Central London grander residential zones, in the leasehold valuation tribunals referred to as "Prime Central London".

See also

Commonhold and Leasehold Reform Act 2002
Compulsory purchase
Director of Buildings and Lands v Shun Fung Ironworks Ltd [1995] UKPC 7
English land law
Re Ellenborough Park [1955] EWCA Civ 4, [1956] Ch 131

References

K Gray and SF Gray, Land Law (7th edn 2011) Ch 11
K Gray and S Gray, ‘Private Property and Public Propriety’, in J McLean (ed), Property and the Constitution (Hart 1999) 36-7

External links
The Act as in force today

United Kingdom Acts of Parliament 1967